The Albany Academy is a school for boys in Albany, New York, US

Albany Academy may also refer to:

Albany Academy for Girls, a school in Albany, New York, US
Albany Academy, Chorley, a school in Chorley, Lancashire, England
Albany Academy, Glasgow, a school in Glasgow, Scotland
Albany Academy, the original name of Lewis & Clark College in Portland, Oregon, US

See also
The Albany Academies
Old Albany Academy Building